Michael Thomas Roth (born February 15, 1990) is an American former professional baseball pitcher. He played in Major League Baseball (MLB) for the Los Angeles Angels of Anaheim and Texas Rangers.

Before beginning his professional career, he played college baseball for the South Carolina Gamecocks at the University of South Carolina, where he was named a First Team All-American after the 2011 season. Roth also represented Great Britain internationally, including at the 2019 European Baseball Championship.

Early life and college career
Roth attended Riverside High School in Greer, South Carolina. In addition to playing for the school's baseball team, Roth also played for the basketball team. As a baseball player, he was named a high school All-American in 2007 and to the Rawlings Preseason All-American Baseball Team in 2008.

Roth then enrolled at the University of South Carolina, where he played college baseball for the South Carolina Gamecocks baseball team in the Southeastern Conference (SEC) of the National Collegiate Athletic Association's (NCAA) Division I. Roth served as a left-handed specialist in the Gamecocks bullpen and also a reserve first baseman, before his first start at the College World Series in 2010 in the National Semifinal, with the Gamecocks in the repechage, playing in the Palmetto Derby, where the sophomore pitcher pitched a shutout to send the Tigers into the repechage. Roth then pitched the second game of the three-game national finals against UCLA, where despite a no-decision, the Gamecocks won the game and the 2010 College World Series (CWS). With only four starts to his name heading into the 2011 season, Roth compiled a 14–3 win–loss record and a 1.06 earned run average (ERA), with 112 strikeouts in 145 innings pitched across 21 games as a junior. Roth led all starting pitchers in NCAA's Division I in ERA in 2011, finishing second in the nation behind Cody Martin of Gonzaga University. The Gamecocks repeated as CWS champions in 2011, with Roth becoming the second pitcher to start in two CWS deciding games, following Michael Stutes in 2006 and 2007.  Named to the CWS All-Tournament Team in 2011, Roth has pitched to a 1.17 ERA in five CWS starts. Roth was named a First Team All-American by Baseball America and a Third Team All-American by Louisville Slugger. He was also named a semifinalist for the Golden Spikes Award and CollegeBaseballInsider.com's National Player of the Year. He was also named to the 2012 Louisville Slugger Preseason All-American Team. Roth was named a Gamecocks' team captain for the 2011 and 2012 seasons.

The Cleveland Indians drafted Roth in the 31st round (938th overall) of the 2011 Major League Baseball Draft. However, Roth chose almost immediately after the 2011 College World Series to return to school, and headed to Alicante (Spain) for a Study Abroad program as part of his International Business degree requirement, and did not sign with the Indians, opting to return to South Carolina for his senior season. Roth was named SEC Co-Pitcher of the Week on February 28, 2012.

Professional career

Los Angeles Angels
The Los Angeles Angels of Anaheim drafted Roth in the 9th round (297th overall) of the 2012 Major League Baseball Draft. He began his professional career in 2012 for the Orem Owlz in the Pioneer League.

Roth pitched for Great Britain in the 2013 World Baseball Classic Qualifiers. In his only game he pitched  innings, giving up four earned runs. Roth possesses dual citizenship with Great Britain and the United States due to his mother's English heritage.

Roth started the 2013 season with the Arkansas Travelers of the Class AA Texas League.  He started, and won, their April 9 game against the Midland RockHounds. On April 13, 2013, with 27 innings of minor league experience, the Angels promoted Roth to the major leagues. Roth made his first major league appearance that evening against the Houston Astros, and pitched two innings of hitless, scoreless relief in the Angels' win.

Roth was designated for assignment by the Angels on April 27, 2014, and outrighted to Arkansas on May 1. He was called back up to the majors again on July 5, 2014. He was designated for assignment again on November 20, 2014, and elected to become a free agent.

Cleveland Indians
The Cleveland Indians signed Roth to a minor league contract in December 2014.

Texas Rangers
The Texas Rangers signed him to a minor league deal on February 22, 2016. He pitched for the Round Rock Express of the Class AAA Pacific Coast League. On July 3, 2016, the Rangers called up Roth from AAA after he posted an ERA under 3. He made his Rangers debut on July 4, 2016, as a relief pitcher in a game against the Boston Red Sox. Roth was designated for assignment after he allowed six runs on 10 hits in  innings against Boston.

Later career
On November 18, 2016, Roth signed a minor league deal with the San Francisco Giants. He was released on July 2, 2017. On July 9, 2017, Roth signed a contract with the Tampa Bay Rays. He elected free agency on November 6, 2017.

Roth signed a minor league contract with the Chicago Cubs in January 2018. On May 25, 2018, Roth was traded to the Texas Rangers and assigned to the Class AAA Round Rock Express. He was released by the organization on August 14, 2018.

Following the 2018 season, Roth announced his retirement from baseball.

International career
Roth played for Team Great Britain in the 2019 European Baseball Championship and was selected to represent Great Britain at the 2023 World Baseball Classic qualification.

Personal life
Roth's father worked as a car salesman, until he quit his job to watch his son pitch in the 2011 College World Series. Roth's mother, Deborah, is English.

Roth married Rachel Sanna on December 17, 2016 in Charleston, South Carolina.

References

External links

Player Bio: South Carolina Gamecocks

1990 births
Living people
Águilas Cibaeñas players
American expatriate baseball players in the Dominican Republic
All-American college baseball players
American people of English descent
Arkansas Travelers players
Baseball players from South Carolina
Major League Baseball players from the United Kingdom
Columbus Clippers players
Durham Bulls players
Iowa Cubs players
Los Angeles Angels players
Major League Baseball pitchers
Mesa Solar Sox players
Orem Owlz players
People from Greer, South Carolina
Round Rock Express players
Sacramento River Cats players
South Carolina Gamecocks baseball players
Texas Rangers players
2019 European Baseball Championship players
Great Britain
Great Britain national baseball team players